Dmitri Viktorovich Kratkov (born 15 January 2002) is a Russian football player who plays for FC Krasnodar and FC Krasnodar-2.

Club career
He made his debut in the Russian Football National League for FC Krasnodar-2 on 17 July 2021 in a game against FC Alania Vladikavkaz.

Kratkov made his Russian Premier League debut for FC Krasnodar on 29 July 2022 against FC Ural Yekaterinburg.

International career
He represented Russia at the 2019 UEFA European Under-17 Championship, where Russia lost all 3 games and was eliminated at group stage.

Career statistics

References

External links
 
 
 
 

2002 births
People from Stavropol Krai
Sportspeople from Stavropol Krai
Living people
Russian footballers
Russia youth international footballers
Association football midfielders
Russian Second League players
Russian First League players
Russian Premier League players
FC Krasnodar-2 players
FC Krasnodar players